Dandelion is a 2014 Vietnamese romantic comedy film directed by Nguyễn Quang Huy, starring Sơn Tùng M-TP, Hari Won, Phạm Quỳnh Anh, Ngô Kiến Huy, Hứa Vĩ Văn. The film's screenplay is based on the book "Bắt đầu từ một kết thúc", an autobiography about the life of the ill-fated singer Wanbi Tuấn Anh.

Plot 
The movie is about Dinh Phong (Son Tung M-TP) and his group of friend: Ngo Kien Ha (Ngo Kien Huy), Pham Quynh Bang (Pham Quynh Anh) whose motto is "Cha so gi, chi so gia" (Afraid nothing, only afraid of getting older), a Korean girl Sky (Hari Won) and Manager Lam (Hua Vi Van) who worships money.

Dinh Phong's father passes away after being hospitalized for a while. One of his wishes are to keep smiling and to eat dog meat before dying. Dinh Phong keeps pursuing music career after the death of his father, even dreams of having a concert on his own, however Manager Lam stops it and forces him to become an actor.

At the audition, one of his eyes is sore so he visits the hospital to be diagnosed with a tumor and have to be hospitalized for a short time. His mom forbids him from singing but he sneaks out of the hospital to perform at liveshows. After leaving the hospital, Manager Lam receive a notice from the doctor informing that Dinh Phong has a cancer and only able to live for 5 years.

Discovering his medical situation, although feeling desperate he still keeps trying to live positively. In the last liveshow, he reveals that Lam is the one who takes all of his money and hides his medical situation so he could keep performing, following his own will. Kien Ha punches Lam and they cry together.

Previously, Phong met Lam at a bridge where Phong said: "I don't care about how long I'm able to live, but as long as I still live, please let me live the happiest life ever, let me sing as much as possible". Phong refuses treatments since he can't stand seeing his family worry about him.

After battling with cancer, Dinh Phong passes away in the mourning of his family and fans.

After his death, his friends visit him at the pagoda. His mother opens crab hotpot as wishes, Lam sends all of Phong's money for children living under unfortunate condition. Ha and Bang get married and have kids, Sky gets married many years later.

Cast
 Sơn Tùng M-TP as Dinh Phong (Đình Phong)
 Hari Won as Sky
 Phạm Quỳnh Anh as Pham Quynh Bang (Phạm Quỳnh Băng)
 Ngô Kiến Huy as Ngo Kien Ha (Ngô Kiến Hà)
 Hứa Vĩ Văn as Lam (Lâm)
 Khánh Huyền as Phong's mother
 Quang Thắng as Phong's father
 Will (365 band) as Tuan Kiet (Tuấn Kiệt)
 Don Nguyễn as Quang Huy, Phong's fantastic fan
 Hà Linh as psychiatrist 
 Thành Lộc as film director
 Jayvee Mai Thế Hiệp as optician 
 Gee Trương as milk tea seller 
 Petey Majik Nguyễn as doctor in Singapore (cameo)
 Ngọc Tưởng as Sky's husband (cameo)
 Tấn Thi as Huy's father (cameo)
 Hoài An as Huy's mother (cameo)
 Harry Lu as himself (Huy's boyfriend / cameo)
 Minh Hằng as herself (cameo)
 Trịnh Thăng Bình as himself (cameo)
 Nguyên Khang as himself (cameo)
 Bảo Anh as herself (cameo)
 Trung Quân Idol as himself (cameo)
 Khổng Tú Quỳnh as herself (cameo)
 Hoàng Tôn as himself (cameo)
 Phạm Hồng Phước as himself (cameo)
 Quốc Thiên as himself (cameo)

Awards and nominations

Release 
The film's official trailer and poster were released on September 8, 2014. At first, the film was set for release on November 14, 2014. However, on November 11, Galaxy Studios and WePro Entertainment, the production companies of "Dandelion" decided to delay the release date but didn't announce another official one. Their press release stated that it was "the issue with the song "Chắc ai đó sẽ về" by Sơn Tùng M-TP that led to the decision". The manufacturers also stated that they would announce another press conference as soon as possible and would provide authentic news to the media.

On the morning of December 5, 2014, Vietnam Ministry of Culture, Sports and Tourism announced that the film could be theatrically released on the condition that Sơn Tùng M-TP must replace the instrumental beat of the song "Chắc ai đó sẽ về" because of certain similarities with that of the song "Because I miss you". Galaxy Studio immediately announced a new release date for the film, December 31, 2014.

Feedback

Ticket sales
Only on the first day of debut, the boy reached the turnover of 6 billions - the figure is quite high with the Vietnamese film. By the end of January 4, the film received about 400,000 spectators in theaters nationwide. With more than 3,000 performances, the boy earned more than 30 billion VND. Almost all major cinemas across the country have the majority of projectors and projection screens throughout the day. In crowded cinemas, the schedule of the boys was very dense, almost 30 minutes away from having a movie theater. According to information from theaters, Dandelion became the first choice of the audience during the New Year 2015, when the movie's screenings are full of theaters. Recorded by the audience, most of them were surprised, excited and tearful when watching the movie. Director Quang Huy directly went to the movie to see the film's effects and commented, "What made me most satisfied was that almost all of the audience responses praised the cast." 

On Friday, January 9, 2015, Director Quang Huy confirmed total revenue of film has reached over 42 billion, after a week to the cinema . After this film is 60 billion.

Professional feedback
In general, the film received a lot of praise, especially from teenagers, in which many people gave praise to the soundtrack. However, a part of the audience still does not appreciate the quality of the film and wait for something new, more attractive in the director Quang Huy in the following.

After the film was released, some viewers commented that the film portrays a different, even misleading image of WanBi Tuấn Anh. Lý Minh Tùng, manager and writer of the autobiography tells about WanBi, also claims that the director "didn't devote all of his" love "to WanBi as promised as he embarked on the adaptation of WanBi's autobiography " He said that "The explanation" just inspired "or declared" Dandelion is not the film about WanBi Tuấn Anh", in my opinion is very intelligent excuse of director Quang Huy, but lack responsible, disrespectful WanBi. " In the introductory line and on the film poster showed the film was adapted from the autobiography, character Đình Phong is "copied" to 80% of the real details from the life of WanBi so can not say only film inspired. The film has a lot of fictitious insults on the decreased people, as his father used to eat and have the "statement" about the dog meat on the bed, or to have an attitude of insolence with his elder, begging kindness and compassion of the audience, colleagues in the music themselves organized to raise money for medical treatment, different from the original image WanBi. Tùng said that from the beginning, he has united with the director can create characters, episodes, but must respect all the details related to character Đình Phong and his family. Finally, he said that the director had to apologize officially for the fictitious influence on WanBi's image.  However, with "the audience," Tùng said that this is an emotional film and have many pluses. He also praised the cast of the film.

In response to these responses, Sơn Tùng M-TP said, "I accept, because I also have fans, so I understand how fans feel for their idol. From the true story of their idol, people have the right to hope, like the character that will be like WanBi, with a smile like WanBi, and physique, spirit ... are like Wanbi. When I heard those words, I told Quang Huy that I accepted, and Huy also told me to accept, because I can't be WanBi.

References 

2014 films
Vietnamese-language films
Vietnamese musical films
2014 romantic comedy films
Vietnamese comedy films